Cages is a ten-issue comic book limited series by Dave McKean. It was published  between 1990 and 1996, and later collected as a single volume.

Cages is a story about artists, belief, creativity and cats, illustrated in a stripped-down pen and ink style.

Publication history
The first seven issues of the series were published by American publisher Tundra (December 1990 - June 1993) and the last three by Kitchen Sink (August 1993 - May 1996).

Plot

Collected editions
Tundra collected the first three issues into one trade paperback in June 1991 (ISBN). Cages was eventually completely collected as a 500-page hardcover volume by Kitchen Sink Press in 1998, and in a new edition by NBM Publishing in 2002. Dark Horse Comics published a softcover edition in July 2009 and a hardcover in October 2010.

Awards
Cages won two Harvey Awards, for "Best New Series" in 1992, when it was also nominated for "Special Award For Excellence In Presentation" and "Best Artist", and "Best Graphic Album of Previously Published Work" in 1999.

It was also nominated for the "Best Finite Series" Eisner Award in 1993 and in the same year McKean was nominated for the "Best Cover Artist" Eisner Award for this work on Cages and Sandman.

Film
McKean revealed, via his Twitter account, that he has been in talks concerning adapting Cages into an animated film.

Notes

References

Harvey Award winners for Best New Series
1998 graphic novels
Ignatz Award winners for Outstanding Graphic Novel or Collection